Monsoon is a 2019 British drama film, written and directed by Hong Khaou and produced by Tracy O'Riordan. It stars Henry Golding, Parker Sawyers, David Tran and Molly Harris.

Monsoon had its world premiere at the Karlovy Vary International Film Festival on 29 June 2019. It was released in the United Kingdom on  25 September 2020, by Peccadillo Pictures.

Synopsis
Kit (Henry Golding), a young British Vietnamese man, returns to his birth country for the first time in over 30 years. He was just six years old when he and his family escaped Saigon as 'boat refugees' after the Vietnam War. No longer familiar with this country and unable to speak his native language, Kit embarks on a personal journey from Saigon to Hanoi in search of a place to scatter his parents’ ashes. Along the way he reconnects with his cousin and childhood friend Lee (David Tran) and falls for Lewis (Parker Sawyers), an American whose father had fought in the war.

During his travels, Kit finally starts to connect to the memories of his parents and his own roots.

Cast
 Henry Golding as Kit
 Parker Sawyers as Lewis
 David Tran as Lee
 Molly Harris as Linh
 Lâm Vissay as Henry

Production
Monsoon was awarded the Sundance Institute/Mahindra Global Filmmaking Award in 2014. The feature was also among the BFI's top ten Film Fund recipients, receiving £800,000.

In March 2018, it was announced Henry Golding had joined the cast of the film, with Hong Khaou directing from a screenplay he wrote. Tracy O'Riordan would serve as a producer on the film, with BBC Films and British Film Institute producing.

When director Hong Khaou's Lilting played at Sundance Film Festival, the Sundance Screenwriter's Lab suggested Khaou pitch them an idea for his next project. In the four years that followed, with the support of the BFI and BBC Films, the film underwent "various incarnations" according to Khaou. As an example, the character of Lewis, an African American in the finished film, started out as Hank, a white American. Khaou stated that the change was made because executives and financiers believed that "the Hank character’s voice – the dominant white American, in terms of the subtext of the war – had been heard before."

Release
Monsoon had its world premiere at the 54th Karlovy Vary International Film Festival in competition on 29 June 2019. In April 2020, Strand Releasing acquired U.S. distribution rights to the film. It was released in the United Kingdom on 25 September 2020, and in the United States on 13 November 2020.

Critical reception
Monsoon has received very positive reviews from critics out of Karlovy Vary International Film Festival. The site's critical consensus reads, "Monsoon sees writer-director Hong Khaou offering a thoughtful look at the emigrant experience, brought beautifully to life by Henry Golding's stellar performance."

Demetrios Matheou, in his review for Screen Daily, said that "it’s a touching, thoughtful and gorgeously shot piece of work, which both examines its protagonist’s experience of displacement and tenderly evokes a country moving energetically forwards while some are still tied painfully to the past." Jessica Kiang, in her review for Variety, called it "A graceful and truthfully irresolute investigation into the strange, often poignantly unreciprocated relationship that many first- and second-generation emigrants have with the far-off foreign country of the past". Giving the film a 'B−' score, Gregory Ellwood writing for The Playlist said "for a naturalistically told story about a man finding his place in the world, slightly more emotion wouldn’t have necessarily been a bad thing". Boyd van Hoeij of The Hollywood Reporter praised the film, calling it "an intimate drama of surprising depth". At Film London's new-look London Screenings, which took place at Picturehouse Central in London's West End from June 24–27, Monsoon was described by one distributor in London as “absolutely charming”.

Monsoon was nominated for the 2021 GLAAD Media Award for Outstanding Film (Limited Release).

References

External links
 
 

2019 films
2019 LGBT-related films
Vietnamese-language films
British drama road movies
British LGBT-related films
LGBT-related drama films
BBC Film films
Films about travel
Films set in Vietnam
Films set in Ho Chi Minh City
Films set in Hanoi
Gay-related films
2019 drama films
2010s English-language films
2010s British films